"Mambo!" is Helena Paparizou's fifth CD single and the first from her international album The Game of Love. There were two versions of the song; a Greek version and an English version. The Greek version was released in November 2005 in Greece and was a major hit going straight to number one for ten weeks including during Christmas. In total, the song charted for 23 weeks, leaving Helena with her most successful CD single to date. The single was released as a CD single and Sony BMG also re-released Helena's debut album Protereotita for a third time with her single under the name of Protereotita: Euro Edition + Mambo!.

In April 2006 it was announced that the English version of her song would be released across the globe in Austria, Switzerland, Poland, Turkey and Spain by Paparizou's own record company Sony BMG. Other record companies released her song in France, the United Kingdom, Italy, the Netherlands, Belgium, Japan, Canada, South Africa, and Australia. Moda Records remixed the song with "My Number One" in the US.  The song supposed to be included on the international re-release of “My Number One”, plans scrapped in favor of the new album.

Releases
"Mambo!" has been released in a number of countries throughout Europe including (in some of them the release was limited); Austria, Belgium, Denmark, Finland, Greece, Ireland, Italy, the Netherlands, Norway, Poland, Sweden, Switzerland and United Kingdom. In some other countries, it hasn't been released physically but it has entered radio airplay charts: Estonia, France, Japan, Romania, Russia, Serbia and others.

Music videos
The original video for "Mambo!" was released in Greece in February 2006. This video is filmed in Greeklish. In the video Paparizou is showing of her dancing skills throughout the video. The video has an office theme for most of the video and Paparizou enters the office and makes everyone in the building dance and have a good time. At the end of the video she and dancers dance together in a routine. The video of Paparizou has been well received in Greece and won 'most played video' in the 2006 MAD TV Music Awards. Throughout the video there are clips of Coca-Cola.

In Sweden, the original video was used but in this video it was all English. In this video there are no Coca-Cola adverts whereas in the Greeklish video filmed for Greece there are.

In May, due to Paparizou starting her international career, "Mambo!" got a new video filmed to be aimed at a more global audience. It took only a day to film on a small island in Greece. On the island there is a bar is in the center of the video with many people partying and dancing to "Mambo!" Towards the end of the video Paparizou is seen dancing in a night scene. In early June, this version of "Mambo!" premiered in France. It has been a hit in music channels in Poland, South Africa and Romania.

Track listings 
UK CD
 "Mambo!" [Radio edit] – 3:06
 "Mambo!" [Alex K remix] – 6:05
 "Mambo!" [Flip & Fill remix] – 6:38
 "Mambo!" [Ruff & Jam club mix] – 7:42
 "Mambo!" [Dancing DJ's remix] – 6:08
 "Mambo!" [Fugitive club mix] – 6:35

Greek CD
 "Mambo!" [Greek version] – 3:05
 "Panta Se Perimena" (Idaniko Fili) – 3:50
 "I Agapi Sou Den Meni Pia Edo" (Aşkın Açamadığı Kapı)
 "Asteria" – 3:52
 "Mambo!" [English version] – 3:06

Dutch CD
 "Mambo!" [English version] – 3:06
 "You Set My Heart on Fire" – 3:13
 "Mambo!" [Greek version] – 3:05

Scandinavian CD
 "Mambo!" [English version] – 3:06
 "Mambo!" [Greek version] – 3:05

Austrian/Belgian/Swiss CD
 "Mambo!" [English version] – 3:06
 "You Set My Heart on Fire" – 3:13

Italian Vinyl
Side A:
 "Mambo!" [Ruff & Jam remix]
 "Mambo!" [Original version] – 3:05
Side B:
 "Mambo!" [Bikini extended mix]
 "Mambo!" [Ruff & Jam radio edit]

Remixes 

Official remixes
 Dancing DJs remix
 The Fugitives club mix
 Todor Ivanov aka DJ AK47 
 Flip & Fill remix
 Ruff & Jam remix
 Alex K remix

Unofficial remixes
 Extended version
 Tech mix
 Jay's Boost mix
 Instrumental version

The compilation called Dance Mania, where the "Mambo" [Dancing Dj Mix] is included, was number one in the UK Charts.

Release history

Charts

Year-end charts

Certifications

References

2005 singles
2006 singles
Dance-pop songs
Helena Paparizou EPs
Helena Paparizou songs
English-language Greek songs
Greek-language songs
Songs written by Alex P
Song recordings produced by Alex P
Songs written by Marcus Englof
Number-one singles in Greece
2005 songs